Wocekiye ("to call on for aid," "to pray," and "to claim relationship with"). The word is sometimes used to denote the practice of contemporary Lakota Spirituality. The Lakota prefer the word spirituality, as opposed to the practice of religion. Central to this spiritual practice is the mythology of Wakȟáŋ Tȟáŋka, or the Great Mystery. Their primary cultural prophet is Ptesáŋwiŋ, White Buffalo Calf Woman, who came as an intermediary between Wakȟáŋ Tȟáŋka and humankind to teach them how to be good relatives by introducing the Seven Sacred Rites and the čhaŋnúŋpa (sacred pipe).

The traditional social system of the Sioux (Očhéthi Šakówiŋ) extended beyond human interaction into the supernatural realms. It is believed that Wakȟáŋ Tháŋka ("Great Spirit/Great Mystery") created the universe and embodies everything in the universe as one. The preeminent symbol of Sioux religion is the Čhaŋgléska Wakȟaŋ ("sacred hoop"), which visually represents the concept that everything in the universe is intertwined.

Wakȟáŋ Tȟáŋka

The creation stories of the Očhéthi Šakówiŋ describe how the various spirits were formed from Wakȟáŋ Tháŋka. Black Elk describes the relationships with Wakȟáŋ Tháŋka as:

Beneficial spirits
There are sixteen Wakȟáŋpi of the Wakȟáŋ Tȟáŋka, which are arranged into groups of four and ranked according to their group.

Superior spirits:
 Wí — Sun
 Škaŋ — Motion, Sky
 Makhá — Earth
 Íŋyaŋ — Stone
Associate spirits:
 Haŋwí — Moon
 Tȟaté — Wind
 Wóȟpe — the Divine Feminine
 Wakíŋyaŋ — Thunder Beings
Subordinate spirits:
 Tȟatȟáŋka — Buffalo
 Hunuŋpa — Bear
 Tȟatúye Tópa — the Four Winds/Directions
 Yumní — the Whirlwind
Inferior spirits:
 Niyá — spirit (breathe)
 Naǧi — ghost (shadow)
 Naǧila — Spirit-like
 Šičúŋ — spiritual potency (intellect)

Malevolent spirits

The Wakȟáŋ Tȟáŋka Šíča are Malevolent (or indifferent) spirits, and follow in rough order of rank:

 Iya or Ibom - Second son of Inyan and an Unktehi. Lord of the Malevolent Gods. Stupid.
 Iktomi - First-born son of Inyan and Wakinyan. A fallen god, doomed to wander the earth as a spirit. The clever trickster.
 Unk - Goddess of passion. Maka's sister. Banished to the underwater world.
 Gnaski - A demon called the crazy buffalo. Daughter of Unk.
 Unktehi - Underwater monsters. The enemies of Wakinyan. Formed from the wrath of Unk when she was tossed into the sea.
 Unkhcegila - Monsters of the land. Formed from the wrath of Unk when she was tossed into the sea.
 Mni Watu - Water sprites.
 Can Oti - Forest dwelling elves.
 Ungla - Goblins who lurk in the night.
 Gica - cunning and malicious manikins who are visible or invisible.
 Waziya - The Old Man, or Wizard, who received his god-like nature from Iktomi, and is therefore doomed to a lonely immortal life on Earth.
 Wakanka - the Old Woman, the Witch, the wife of Waziya, doomed forever to a lonely immortal life on Earth.
 Anog Ite - Daughter of Waziya and Wakanka. The mother of the Four Winds, whose father was Tate. Also the mother of Yumni. Because she intrigued with Iktomi, she is doomed to a lonely immortal life on Earth.
 Wanagi - Rejected ghost spirits who fail the test of To Win, doomed to wander the earth.
 Hohnogica - Spirits of the home & hearth.

There are also a variety of other spirits in the world. They are indifferent to humans, but may cause harm, or be convinced to help humans.
 The Star People
 The Underworld Buffalo People
 Very Old People - have power which can be used for evil.
 Moon Women - When on their moon, women who are easily tricked or duped by Gnaski, Anog Ite and Iktomi.
 Tunkan (Tuh-kaw) - Spirits of the rocks. They are said to play a major role in the sweat lodge ceremonies.

Types of medicine and holy people

 Wicasa Wakan - "Holy Men" who lead the regular public & private religious ceremonies and record tribal history. They keep track of the moons of the year and the related weather patterns & bird songs. Some make songs based on those of the various birds, from different times of the year, telling what kinds of things happen in the natural world during that time. 
 Pejuta Wicasa - The Medicine Men. The healers & physicians, practitioners of herbal medicines as well as metaphysical healing ceremonies. 
 Holy Dancers - Specific people charged with performing certain sacred dances for different reasons throughout the year. Their sacred regalia may be elaborate & considered holy, with no one but the intended dancer allowed to touch them.

Common Beliefs

 When one's pets die, their souls stay in this world and take care of one. When one dies, all ascend to the next world together.
 Those who practice medicine must never fall prey to the belief that the power originates from them, or they will lose the power to heal forever.
 "Thunder Hears Me" is a common expression, usually used in place of "I swear to god" when one is making a threat or promise. Essentially, may the thunderbird strike me down is I am lying. The less intense version is "The Earth Hears Me."

References

Native American religion
Sioux culture